Cars: Radiator Springs Adventures is a minigame collection PC game by American studios AWE Games and Rainbow Studios based on the 2006 Disney-Pixar film Cars. The platform it is designed for Microsoft Windows and Macintosh. It was released on June 6, 2006 and published by THQ. It was intended for the early Cars childhood market, ages 4 and up. There was another version exclusively to Target stores. It was more of an arcade style version made for all gaming systems.

Gameplay
The game consists of 10 activities and 10 championship races when players beat the activity's five levels. When players complete all activities, they compete in a championship race against another character. In those races, the transmission is manual, not automatic. There is no free drive like in Cars: The Video Game, it just drops McQueen onto a random area and he just drives there to the activity players choose. Each activity has instructions on how to do this and memorization is required to play a game like this. All games use the mouse controls or holding down the arrows. In this game, the player is Lightning McQueen. He and his friends interact in a series of activities and races around Radiator Springs. There are about 10 activities. Some of the activities are centered around Lightning's friends; some include Hip-hop It Up (Ramone), Sarge's Boot Camp, Speed Trap (Sheriff), Tow the Line (Mater), and a few more. After successfully completing these activities Lightning has to defeat others in the Rev It Up Drag Races. If the player wins all 9 races, they compete with Chick Hicks, Lightning's arch rival.

References

2006 video games
Cars (franchise) video games
MacOS games
Racing video games
THQ games
Windows games
Disney video games
Video games based on films
Video games set in Arizona
Video games developed in the United States